Tribeni, Nepal  is a Binayee Triveni Rural municipality in Parbat District in Gandaki Province of central Nepal. At the time of the 2011 Nepal census it had a population of 33119.

References

External links
pdf UN map of the municipalities of Nawalparasi District

Populated places in Parbat District